Muhammet Uzuner (born 30 June 1965) is a Turkish actor. He is best known for his performance as Doctor Cemal in Once Upon a Time in Anatolia.

References

External links 

1965 births
Living people
Turkish male film actors